The Premier of the Soviet Union was the head of government of the Union of Soviet Socialist Republics (USSR). The office had four different names throughout its existence: Chairman of the Council of People's Commissars (1923–1946), Chairman of the Council of Ministers (1946–1991), Prime Minister (January – August 1991) and Chairman of the Committee on the Operational Management of the Soviet Economy (August–December 1991). Long before 1991, most non-Soviet sources referred to the post as "Premier" or "Prime Minister."

Twelve individuals held the post. Of these, two died in office of natural causes (Vladimir Lenin and Joseph Stalin), three resigned – Alexei Kosygin, Nikolai Tikhonov and Ivan Silayev – and three were concurrently party leader and head of government (Lenin, Stalin and Nikita Khrushchev). By this account, Ivan Silayev spent the shortest time in office at 119 days. At more than 16 years, Kosygin spent the longest time in office.

History
Lenin's First Government was created on 6 July 1923 by the Central Executive Committee with Lenin as its first chairman. The government was empowered to initiate decrees and legislation that were binding throughout the USSR. After the ousting of Khrushchev in 1964, Kosygin was appointed head of government. However, Kosygin's prestige was weakened when he proposed the economic reform of 1965. Upon Valentin Pavlov's ascension to the premiership, the Council of Ministers was abolished and replaced with the Cabinet of Ministers. After the August coup of 1991, the majority of the cabinet members endorsed the coup, leading the Cabinet of Ministers dissolving and being replaced by the Committee on the Operational Management of the Soviet Economy in 1991. The government of the Russian Soviet Federative Socialist Republic began seizing Soviet ministries in the aftermath of the coup, and by December 1991 the Soviet government had completely lost control of itself and shut down entirely.

Under the 1977 Soviet Constitution, the head of government was the leader of the highest executive and administrative organ of state.  The head of government was appointed by and accountable to the Supreme Soviet (and its Presidium). The head of government was tasked with resolving all state administrative duties within the jurisdiction of the USSR to the degree which were not the responsibility of the Supreme Soviet or its Presidium. The head of government managed the national economy, formulated the five-year plans and ensured socio-cultural development. It functioned as the most influential office of government until the establishment of the Office of the President of the Soviet Union in 1990.

List of officeholders

See also 

 
 
 
 Deputy Premier of the Soviet Union
 First Deputy Premier of the Soviet Union
 List of heads of state of the Soviet Union
 List of leaders of the Soviet Union

Notes

References

Citations

Sources 

 
 
 
 
 
 
 
 
 
 
 
 
 
 
 
 
 
 
 
 
 
 

Soviet Union, Premier

Premier
Premier